The Economic Development Bank for Puerto Rico  (BDE) is a government-owned corporation of Puerto Rico that provides loans, loan guarantees, and funds to private organizations whose economic activities have the effect of replacing imports in Puerto Rico. The Bank was established by Law No. 22 of 1985.

References

External links
 www.bde.pr.gov – official site 

Government-owned corporations of Puerto Rico
Development in North America